Sport in Tasmania is participation in and attendance at organised sports events in the state of Tasmania in Australia.

According to the 2020 Sports Australia AusPlay survey results 88.3% of Tasmanian adults and 69.5% of Tasmanian children participate in some form of sport or physical activity at least once per year, which is -1.1% and -3.6% respectively below the national average.

The most popular sports by participation in Tasmania (excluding general recreational activities such as walking or attending a gym) as of 30 December 2020 are Swimming, Running/Athletics, Football/Soccer, Australian Rules Football, Cricket, Golf, and Basketball. The most popular team sport for female participation is Netball, and for male participation is Cricket.

For the 2020/21 financial year the Tasmanian State Government has budgeted nearly $2,000,000 (AUD) in funding for organised sports - principally Australian Rules Football, Basketball, Cricket, and Football/Soccer - and $1,000,000 (AUD) to funding a participation program for children, with additional grants and funding available.

Athletics
Athletics Tasmania is the peak body for athletics in the state. Until recently, Hobart hosted the annual Briggs Track Classic at the Domain Athletic Centre as part of the national Australian Athletics Tour.  Other areas also hold annual events called 'Gifts' such as the Burnie Gift. The North-West town Penguin also held the National Running Championships in 2015.

Ball and basket sports

Basketball
Tasmania has previously hosted teams in the highest tiers of Basketball in Australia, however currently has no teams participating in the highest leagues. The Hobart Devils existed in the National Basketball League (NBL) from 1983 to 1996. Launceston also had a team in the NBL from 1980 - 1982 called Launceston City Casino.

In the Women's National Basketball League (WNBL), the Hobart Islanders won the national competition in 1991. The team was led by home-grown and three-time WNBL Most Valuable Player, Kathy Foster. The Islanders withdrew from the competition in the mid-1990s.

Starting from the 2021–22 NBL season, the Tasmania JackJumpers will compete in the NBL.

Netball
Netball is popular in Tasmania, although Tasmania does not have a team in the Suncorp Super Netball but it does have one in the Australian Netball League called Tasmanian Magpies.

Cricket 

Cricket Tasmania administers the Tasmanian Grade Cricket competitions of cricket in Tasmania, and selects the players for the Tasmanian Tigers, who are the state's first class cricket team for men. They are also responsible for the selection of players for Tasmanian Roar, the state's women's representative side. The Tasmanian Tigers are based at Bellerive Oval and represent the state in domestic competitions such as the Matador BBQs One-Day Cup, the Sheffield Shield, and formerly in the KFC Twenty20 Big Bash.  As of 2016 the Hobart Hurricanes represent Tasmania in the KFC Big Bash League. At present the Tasmanian Roar only compete in the Women's National Cricket League Twenty20 competition. Bellerive Oval also hosts international matches (Tests and One Day matches) of the Australian cricket team and touring sides.

Football codes

Australian rules football

Tasmania was the first place outside of Victoria to play Australian football, playing Victorian Rules since 1864.  Tasmania has competed strongly in Interstate matches in Australian rules football since its first colonial match in 1884, forming a strong rival with traditional powerhouse Victoria, however played its last competitive match in the 1990 State of Origin series which resulted a victory over Victoria in Hobart.

In 2005, Tasmania's participation rate in Australian Rules for men between 5 – 39 years was 22%, the highest in Australia.

The main leagues now are the statewide Tasmanian Football League (which has existed on and off since 1879) and its conferences, the Southern Football League and the Northern Tasmanian Football League.  A representative club, the Tasmanian Devils participated in the Victorian Football League between 2001–2008 and attracted attendances of over 10,000 on two occasions.

There is no Tasmanian team in a national competition, the Australian Football League, however a Tasmanian AFL Bid has been ongoing. Victorian AFL teams have been playing AFL Premiership season matches in Tasmania since 1991. Fitzroy (1991-1992), Hawthorn (2001 - 2020), St Kilda (2001 - 2006) and North Melbourne (2012 - 2016) have all played at least 2 home games in Tasmania in various seasons. 

The Tasmanian Gaelic Football and Hurling Association run weekly training sessions and games in summer in Hobart to avoid competing with major winter sports.

Rugby league
The Tasmanian Rugby League reestablished a summer competition in 2009.

Table Tennis
First introduced in the early 20th Century Table Tennis is the most played sport in the world with all 226 Countries and Territories affiliated with the ITTF. In Tasmania it is played all year-round. There are large clubs in Burnie, Devonport, Port Sorell, Deloraine, Launceston, Glenorchy, Clarence, Kingston and at the University of Tasmania. see www.tttas.org.au

Touch football
Touch Football is played in the Summer months in Tasmania. Competitions are located in Hobart, Launceston, Devonport and Burnie.

Rugby union
The Tasmanian Rugby Union Statewide League consists of 10 Teams and was first established in 1933. The senior men's state representative side for the Tasmanian Rugby Union is the Tasmanian Jack Jumpers. Rugby union in Tasmania consists of the following divisions : Men's, Women's, Junior Under 18, Junior Under 16, Juniors Under 14.

Soccer

The Football Federation Tasmania (FFT) is the governing body for associational football (soccer) in Tasmania.  FFT runs men's, women's and youth competitions in both the North and South of Tasmania.  The main season is run in winter.

Since 2013 the highest male level of competition in Tasmania is the NPL Tasmania which forms part of the National Premier Leagues nationally.  The NPL Tasmania includes teams from all major regions in Tasmania. At the conclusion of each season the premier team goes onto play the winners of other states in the national NPL finals series. The equal next levels of male competition are the Southern Championship and the Northern Championship .

Aurora Stadium has hosted two A-League pre-season games, attracting over 8000 spectators at the 2007–08 match.  FFT is actively pursuing the possibility of an A-League club based in the state.

Golf
Tasmania has numerous golf courses spread throughout the island.  The town of Bridport in the northeast is home to Barnbougle Dunes, a public golf course designed by architect Tom Doak which opened in 2004 and is ranked among the top 100 courses in the world.

Hockey and indoor hockey
Hockey Tasmania governs and administers the sport of hockey and indoor hockey for most of Tasmania. It also administers the senior Tasmanian representative club The Tassie Tigers which fields a Men's and a Women's team in the elite national domestic competition Hockey One which generally plays its annual home and away season in the months of September, October, and November across Australia. Hockey One and the Tassie Tigers club replaced the now-defunct Australian Hockey League and the former men's and women's teams the Tassie Tigers and the Tassie Van Demons in 2019.

Hockey is predominantly played on synthetic surfaces in Tasmania, although some junior and school competitions do still play on grass fields. There are five hockey centres around the state with synthetic pitches that host a variety of senior and junior competitions: The Tasmanian Hockey Centre, with three synthetic pitches, in Hobart; the Northern Hockey Centre, with two synthetic pitches, in Launceston; one synthetic pitch at Meercroft Park in Devonport; one synthetic pitch at McKenna Park in Burnie; and one synthetic pitch in Smithton.

Horse racing
There are a number of thoroughbred and harness race courses in Tasmania including the Elwick Race Course and Launceston Racecourse in Mowbray  which host the Hobart Cup and Launceston Cup respectively.

Motorsport
Tasmania hosts a round of the V8 Supercars championship each year at Symmons Plains Raceway, in the Northern Midlands of the state, although the Tasmanian Government has not promised to fund the event past 2011 which may lead to the event being withdrawn.

A number of racing categories compete for the Tasmanian Super Series at Symmons Plains and Baskerville Raceway near Hobart, each year.

The Australian Grand Prix was twice held in Tasmania, at the Longford Circuit, in 1959, and 1965.

Launceston, Tasmania is also the birthplace of Marcos Ambrose who was V8 Supercar champion in 2003 and 2004 before relocating to the US to race NASCAR.

Targa Tasmania is a six-day tarmac-based rally has been held annually since 1992.  A smaller version the Targa Wrest Point is also held annually. The Tasmanian Rally Series is held over four rallies annually.

Vigoro
Tasmania is one of the three Australian states which play Vigoro.

Water sports

Swimming
Swimming Tasmania is the governing body for swimming in Tasmania.  The Hobart Aquatic Centre has hosted significant championships including the Australian Swimming Championships.  Other significant aquatic facilities include: Clarence Aquatic Centre and Launceston Aquatic.

Water skiing
There are a number of active water ski clubs in Tasmania. These include
Meadowbank Water Ski Club, Northern Aquatic Club, Roseberry Ski Club, Kentish Aquatic Club and the Horsehead Water Ski Club.

Water polo
Water Polo Tasmania is the governing body of water polo in Tasmania. The Hobart Aquatic Centre is the main venue for these events and is host to local and national water polo matches. The main local event is the Club Water Polo Championships held in southern Tasmania between the four clubs: Clarence, Sandy Bay, UTAS Honey Badgers and Wet Magic. A schools competition is run for Grades 5-12 during Term 2/3 which many southern schools participate in. Tasmania fields many state teams which compete at national competitions and has had a number of athletes selected to national teams over the years.

Winter sports

Snow skiing

The most southerly ski fields in Australia are located in Tasmania. Much of the State is subject to at least occasional winter snows. Mount Ossa is the highest point on the island at 1614 m, but Tasmania has eight mountains exceeding 1500 m and 28 above 1,220 m. Also notable is the Central Plateau, at an elevation of around 900 m. The capital city of Hobart is built at the base of Mount Wellington, which at 1270 m is snow-capped in winter.

Tasmania's premier Alpine skiing operations are located at Ben Lomond 60 km from Launceston. The village is at 1460m and the top elevation is 1570m. Limited downhill ski operations also exist in the Mount Field National Park at Mount Mawson, which is approximately 89 kilometres north west of Hobart and rises from 1200 m to 1320 m altitude.

One of Australia's most scenic alpine locations is located in Tasmania at Cradle Mountain, where cross country skiing is possible. Cradle Mountain is part of the Tasmanian Wilderness World Heritage Area, inscribed by UNESCO in 1982.

Ice hockey
The Ice Hockey Tasmania conducts, encourages, promotes, advances, controls and administers all forms of Ice Hockey in Tasmania. The main ice hockey venue is the Glenorchy Ice Skating Rink.

Racquet sports

Tennis
Tasmania hosts the Moorilla International tennis tournament as part of the lead-up to the Australian Open.  The tournament is a professional tournament involving women's singles and doubles competitions played at the Hobart International Tennis Centre on the Domain in Hobart.

Real tennis
The Hobart Real Tennis Club is one of the oldest sporting clubs in the Southern hemisphere, having been founded in 1875. The court is located at 45 Davey Street, Hobart, Tasmania.  It is the oldest real tennis club in Australia and one of the oldest existing clubs in the real tennis world.

Yachting
The Sydney to Hobart Yacht Race has taken place between Boxing Day and New Year every year since 1945.  The race finishes at the Royal Yacht Club of Tasmania in Hobart.  Another popular annual race is the Australian Three Peaks Race.

See also
Department of Economic Development, Tourism and the Arts

References